Zavarov is a Russian masculine surname, its feminine counterpart is Zavarova. It may refer to
Oleksandr Zavarov (born 1961), Ukrainian football midfielder 
Valeriy Zavarov (born 1988), Ukrainian football midfielder, son of Oleksandr

Russian-language surnames